Padmanabhan Balachandran Nair (2 February 1952 – 5 April 2021) was an Indian writer, playwright, scenarist, director, and actor. He was known for his work in Malayalam literature and Malayalam cinema.

Career 
Balachandran is best known for the play Paavam Usman for which he won the Kerala Sahitya Akademi Award and Kerala Professional Nataka Award in the year 1989. He has scripted many films including Ulladakkam (1991), Pavithram (1994), Agnidevan (1995), Punaradhivasam (2000), and Kammatti Paadam (2016). His directorial debut is Ivan Megharoopan (2012). He has also acted in a few films, the most notable being Trivandrum Lodge (2012).

Personal life
He was born to Padmanabha Pillai and Saraswati Bhai  on 2 February 1952, in Sasthamkotta, Kerala. He was married to Sreelatha and the couple had two children, Sreekanth and Parvathy.

Death
Balachandran died, aged 69, on 5 April 2021 at his residence at Vaikom. He had suffered from brain fever for a long time and was hospitalized many times, the last time being in July 2020. His body was cremated with full state honours.

Awards
 1989: Kerala Sahitya Akademi Award for Drama – Paavam Usman
 2008: Kerala Sangeetha Nataka Akademi Award for Drama

Filmography

As actor

As director

As script writer

References

External links
 
 P Balachandran at MSI

1952 births
Male actors from Kollam
Writers from Kollam
Malayalam-language writers
Malayalam-language dramatists and playwrights
Indian male film actors
Male actors in Malayalam cinema
Malayalam screenwriters
Malayalam film directors
2021 deaths
Recipients of the Kerala Sahitya Akademi Award
20th-century Indian dramatists and playwrights
20th-century Indian male actors
20th-century Indian film directors
21st-century Indian film directors
Screenwriters from Kerala
Film directors from Kerala
Recipients of the Kerala Sangeetha Nataka Akademi Award